Cooper University Hospital is a teaching hospital and biomedical research facility located in Camden, New Jersey. The hospital formerly served as a clinical campus of Robert Wood Johnson Medical School and the University of Medicine and Dentistry of New Jersey. Affiliated with Cooper Medical School of Rowan University, the hospital offers training programs for medical students, residents, fellows, nurses, and allied health professionals. In partnership with the University of Texas MD Anderson Cancer Center, Cooper operates a comprehensive cancer center serving patients in New Jersey and the Delaware Valley.

Cooper is affiliated with the Coriell Institute for Medical Research and is a tertiary partner for twenty-one regional hospitals.

History

Cooper University Hospital was established in 1887 by the family of a prominent Quaker physician called Richard M. Cooper. The original hospital had 30 beds and provided health care services to the low-income population of Camden. It slowly grew from a small community hospital into a 635-bed regional tertiary care center. In 1982, it opened a trauma center that remains one of only three state-designated Level I Trauma Centers in New Jersey. It is certified by the American College of Surgeons and serves as the regional trauma center for southern New Jersey counties. It also serves as a resource for Level II Trauma Centers in the South Jersey region. Cooper admits nearly 3000 trauma patients each year, making it the busiest center in New Jersey.

Cooper serves as southern New Jersey's major tertiary-care referral hospital for specialized services and is home to the Bone & Joint Institute, Heart Institute, Neurological Institute and Urological Institute.

In 2010, the hospital launched the first medical evacuation helicopter service in Cumberland County.

In 2012, the American talk show host Kelly Ripa became an official spokesperson for Cooper.

Currently, Cooper stands as one of the largest healthcare providers in the region with over 1.2 million outpatient visits annually and over 7,000 employees. The Cooper Institutes and Centers of Excellence include: The Bone and Joint Institute, MD Anderson Cancer Center at Cooper, The Ripa Center for Women's Health and Wellness, The Cooper Heart Institute and Center for Population Health, among many others.

In 2022, a $2 billion expansion of the hospital was announced, which is expected to take about a decade to complete.

MD Anderson Cancer Center at Cooper

George Norcross, a prominent philanthropist in New Jersey and chairman of the board at Cooper, led the effort to create a new partnership between Cooper University Hospital and the world-renowned MD Anderson Cancer Center. In 2013, the two institutions opened a $100 million free-standing facility that houses comprehensive outpatient cancer services, including medical oncology, radiation oncology, surgical oncology, gynecologic oncology, and urology. Other resources include a new pathology laboratory, linear accelerator and PET-CT facility. The center offers patients in the Delaware Valley access to MD Anderson's cancer treatment protocols and clinical trials. The MD Anderson Cancer unit at Cooper has 30 inpatient state-of-the-art private rooms on the fifth floor of the Roberts Pavilion.

Cooper University Hospital is one of three co-branded partner institutions of MD Anderson Cancer Center, which also include the Banner MD Anderson Cancer Center in Arizona and MD Anderson International in Spain. 
The MD Anderson Cancer Center at Cooper had over 6,500 new patient visits in 2016.
The Leapfrog Group for Pancreatic Surgery ranks MD Anderson Cooper number one in the state of New Jersey for safety in Pancreatic surgery.

Statistics

In 2016, according to their annual report, Cooper University Hospital had:
 Hospital admissions: 30,573 
 Surgical cases: 19,941
 MD Anderson new patient visits: 6,564
 Emergency department visits: 78,270
 Transfer volume to Cooper: 6,034
 Outpatient visits: 1,583,241
 Urgent care visits: 43,433
 Trauma cases: 3,682

Expansion

In June 2004, Cooper University Hospital announced a $220 million expansion to the hospital's Health Sciences Campus that includes a new patient care pavilion attached to the existing facility. Subsequently, plans for the new patient care pavilion were expanded from six floors (211,000 sq ft.) to ten floors (312,000 sq ft.), with the inclusion of additional landscape improvements and patient amenity design features.

Cooper University Hospital's pavilion project is part of the hospital's efforts to create a regional health science campus in Camden, which will also include a new $130 million Academic and Research Building, as well as a stem cell institute, cancer institute, clinical research building, clinical office building and additional off-street parking.

Designed by EwingCole of Philadelphia, the patient pavilion opened in December 2008 and the hospital's orientation was shifted from Haddon Avenue to Martin Luther King Boulevard, as visitors began entering the hospital through the new lobby and utilizing the Camden County Improvement Authority parking, which connects to the hospital via an enclosed walkway.

The hospital is a planned stop on the Glassboro–Camden Line, an  diesel multiple unit (DMU) light rail system projected for completion in 2019, which will connect to the River LINE.

References

External links
 

Hospital buildings completed in 1887
Buildings and structures in Camden, New Jersey
Hospitals established in 1887
1887 establishments in New Jersey
Teaching hospitals in New Jersey
Rutgers University
Rowan University
Trauma centers